Provincial Road 313 (PR 313) is a provincial road in the eastern region of Manitoba, Canada.  It begins at PTH 11 near Lac du Bonnet and ends at the remote community of Pointe du Bois.  

PR 313 provides the main access to cottage country in the Lac du Bonnet area.  It is also part of a loop (together with PR 304, PR 314, PR 315, and PTH 11) that provides access to several remote communities, First Nations reserves, and provincial parks on the eastern side of Lake Winnipeg .

References

External links 
Manitoba Official Map

313